Robert Garvey (1908–1983) was a Jewish author. He served as Executive Secretary of the Jewish Book Publishers Association (1972–1976). Robert Garvey died in New York in 1983.

Partial bibliography
Good Shabbos, Everybody! (illustrated by Maurice Sendak, 1951)
A First Chanukah Word Book (1952)
The Ghosts of Camp J (1955)
Holidays are Nice: Around the Year With the Jewish Child (illustrated by Arnold Lobel and Ezekiel Schloss, 1960)
Happy Holiday (1960)
What Feast? And Other Tales (1974)
The Hanukah Play (1979)

References

American children's writers
1908 births
1983 deaths
Jewish American writers
20th-century American Jews